Nakchivanski, also spelled Naxcivanski and Nakhitchevansky, is a noble family of Azerbaijani origin with subsequent branches established in Russia and Iran. They have provided famous generals and military personnel, one of them - Huseyn Khan Nakhchivanski was the only Muslim to serve as General-Adjutant of the H.I.M. Retinue.

Background 
The Nakhchivanski family is a cadet branch of Kangarli dynasty, itself a part of Ustajlu Qizilbash tribe. Ehsan Khan Kangarli was the first member of the dynasty to adopt a Russified surname, thus establishing his own branch. They were intermarried with Bahmani family of Qajar dynasty and Makinsky family of Maku Khanate. They were the largest landowners in Nakhchivan uyezd.

Nowadays 
After the Soviet takeover of Azerbaijan, Christian members of the Nakhchivanski family mostly emigrated to Europe and beyond, while Muslim members stayed back and changed their surnames in order to flee persecution, such as famous opera singer Khurshid Qajar, who adopted her husband's surname even after his death; or immigrated to Iran to serve in Qajar Army. A Christian branch descended from Huseyn Khan Nakhchivanski lives in United States of America.

Notable members 
 Huseyn Khan Nakhchivanski – General of the cavalry, General-Adjutant of the H.I.M. Retinue.
 Ehsan Khan Kengerli – Last ruler of the Nakhichevan Khanate. The paternal grandfather of Huseyn Khan Nakhchivanski.
 Bahram Khan Nakhichevansky – Last General Governor of the Nakhichevan Khanate.
 Khurshid Qajar-Iravani – Member of the ruling family of the Erivan Khanate, mother of Ehsan Khan Kengerli.
 Jamshid Khan Nakhchivanski – Russian Imperial, Azerbaijani and Soviet military commander. He rose to the rank of Combrig (equivalent to Brigadier General) in the Soviet Army.
 Jafargulu Khan Nakhchivanski – Mayor of Nakhchivan, later honorary magistrate of Erivan, head of Republic of Aras.
 Kelbali Khan Nakhchivanski – Son of Jafargulu Khan Nakhchivanski, older brother of Jamshid Khan Nakhchivanski. Escaped to Iran after Soviet takeover of Azerbaijan, where he served as a general in the Shah's army until he was assassinated.
 Feyzullah Mirza Qajar – Prince of Persia's Qajar dynasty and Azerbaijani military commander. Part of Huseyn Khan Nakhchivanski's regiment during the Russo-Japanese War.
 Khurshid Qajar – Azerbaijani opera singer
 Qonchabeyim – Azerbaijani poetess, translator of Nikoloz Baratashvili to Azerbaijani.
 Isgandar Mashtava – Soviet army commander, recipient of the Order of Red Banner

References 

 Azerbaijani noble families
 People from Nakhchivan
 White Russian emigrants
Azerbaijani families
Nakhchivanskis